Ingalls is a city in Gray County, Kansas, United States.  As of the 2020 census, the population of the city was 252.

History
The first post office was established in May 1887 with the name Soule until May 1888. The community was renamed for Kansas senator John James Ingalls.

Ingalls was a candidate for county seat in the late 1880s, and once held the county offices.

Geography
Ingalls is located at  (37.829932, -100.453844).

Demographics

2010 census
As of the census of 2010, there were 306 people, 113 households, and 87 families residing in the city. The racial makeup of the city was 87.3% White, 0.3% African American, 0.3% Asian, 11.4% from other races, and 0.7% from two or more races. Hispanic or Latino of any race were 22.5% of the population.

There were 113 households, of which 41.6% had children under the age of 18 living with them, 62.8% were married couples living together, 7.1% had a female householder with no husband present, 7.1% had a male householder with no wife present, and 23.0% were non-families. 19.5% of all households were made up of individuals, and 5.3% had someone living alone who was 65 years of age or older. The average household size was 2.71 and the average family size was 3.10.

The median age in the city was 32.3 years. 27.1% of residents were under the age of 18; 12.2% were between the ages of 18 and 24; 29% were from 25 to 44; 22.6% were from 45 to 64; and 9.2% were 65 years of age or older. The gender makeup of the city was 50.3% male and 49.7% female.

2000 census
As of the census of 2000, there were 328 people, 111 households, and 83 families residing in the city. The racial makeup of the city was 87.50% White, 0.30% Native American, 10.37% from other races, and 1.83% from two or more races. Hispanic or Latino of any race were 15.55% of the population.

There were 111 households, out of which 47.7% had children under the age of 18 living with them, 69.4% were married couples living together, 3.6% had a female householder with no husband present, and 25.2% were non-families. 22.5% of all households were made up of individuals, and 6.3% had someone living alone who was 65 years of age or older. The average household size was 2.95 and the average family size was 3.52.

In the city, the population was spread out, with 35.1% under the age of 18, 6.7% from 18 to 24, 33.5% from 25 to 44, 15.9% from 45 to 64, and 8.8% who were 65 years of age or older. The median age was 31 years. For every 100 females, there were 111.6 males. For every 100 females age 18 and over, there were 106.8 males.

The median income for a household in the city was $35,357, and the median income for a family was $38,036. Males had a median income of $36,563 versus $26,875 for females. The per capita income for the city was $14,898. About 14.6% of families and 15.5% of the population were below the poverty line, including 19.8% of those under age 18 and 27.8% of those age 65 or over.

Education
Ingalls is served by USD 477 Ingalls. The Ingalls High School mascot is Bulldogs.

References

Further reading

External links
 Ingalls - Directory of Public Officials
 USD 477, local school district
 Ingalls City Map, KDOT

Cities in Kansas
Cities in Gray County, Kansas
Kansas populated places on the Arkansas River